Evan Hoyt and Wu Tung-lin were the defending champions but chose not to defend their title.

André Göransson and Ben McLachlan won the title after defeating Andrew Harris and John-Patrick Smith 6–3, 5–7, [10–5] in the final.

Seeds

Draw

References

External links
 Main draw

Canberra Tennis International - Men's doubles
2023 Men's doubles